Indirect presidential elections were held in Guatemala on 5 June 1993. They were sparked by the 1993 Guatemalan constitutional crisis in which President Jorge Serrano Elías had attempted a self-coup. The result was a victory for Ramiro de León Carpio, who won unopposed in the second round of voting, whilst the army-backed Arturo Herbruger was elected vice-president.

Results

References

Bibliography
Dosal, Paul J. Power in transition: the rise of Guatemala’s industrial oligarchy, 1871-1994. Westport: Praeger. 1995.
Fischer, Edward F. Cultural logics and global economies: Maya identity in thought and practice. Austin: University of Texas Press, Austin. 2001.
Keesing’s record of world events June 1993.
McCleary, Rachel M. Dictating democracy: Guatemala and the end of violent revolution. Gainesville: University Press of Florida. 1999.
Steigenga, Timothy J. The politics of the spirit: the political implications of pentecostalized religion in Costa Rica and Guatemala. Lanham, Maryland: Lexington Books. 2001.
Villagrán Kramer, Francisco. Biografía política de Guatemala: años de guerra y años de paz. Guatemala: FLACSO. 2004.
Warren, Kay B. Indigenous movements and their critics: Pan-Maya activism in Guatemala. Princeton: Princeton University Press. 1998.

Presidential elections in Guatemala
1993 in Guatemala
Guatemala